Jack Costanzo (September 24, 1919 – August 18, 2018) was an American percussionist.

Biography
A composer, conductor and drummer, Costanzo is best known for having been a bongo player, and was nicknamed "Mr. Bongo". He visited Havana three times in the 1940s and learned to play Afro-Cuban rhythms on the bongos and congas.

Costanzo started as a dancer, touring as a team with his wife before World War II. After his discharge from the Navy, he worked as a dance instructor at the Beverly Hills Hotel, where Latin band leader Bobby Ramos heard Costanzo playing bongos in a jam session and offered him a job. Throughout the 1940s, Costanzo worked with several Latin bands, including a revived version of the Lecuona Cuban Boys, Desi Arnaz, and Rene Touzet.
 
Costanzo toured with Stan Kenton from 1947–48 and occasionally in the 1950s, and played with Nat King Cole from 1949 to 1953. He also played with the Billy May Orchestra, Peggy Lee, Danny Kaye, Perez Prado, Charlie Barnet, Pete Rugolo, Betty Grable, Harry James, Judy Garland, Patti Page, Jane Powell, Ray Anthony, Martin & Lewis, Frances Faye, Dinah Shore, Xavier Cugat, Frank Sinatra, Tony Curtis, and Eddie Fisher.

Costanzo formed his own band in the 1950s which recorded and toured internationally. Many Hollywood stars studied bongos with him, including Marlon Brando, Rita Moreno, Carolyn Jones, Hugh O'Brian, Keenan Wynn, Van Johnson, Tony Curtis, Betty Grable, Vic Damone, James Dean, and Gary Cooper.

Costanzo was in retirement until 1998 when he decided to make a comeback and in 2001 recorded Back From Havana under the Ubiquity Records umbrella. This album featured the likes of Black Note's Gilbert Castellanos, Steve Firerobing and the Panamanian singer Marilu. In 2002 he released another album with the same cast called Scorching the skins this time he also added Quino from Big Mountain. Costanzo has continued to tour and perform in California and abroad.

Costanzo died of complications from a ruptured abdominal aortic aneurysm at his home in Lakeside, California on August 18, 2018, aged 98.

Discography
Albums
 Bongo Cha-Cha-Cha!, (Golden Tone) C 4061
 King of the Bongos
 Bongo Fever, (Sunset) SUS-5134
 Afro Can Can, (Liberty) LRP-3137
 Learn–Play Bongos, Liberty LRP-3177
 Jack Costanzo and His Afro Cuban Band, GNP Crescendo GNP-19
 Vivo Tirado, GNP Crescendo GNPS 2057
 Mr. Bongo Afro Cuban Band, (Palladium) PLP 126
 1949: Nat King Cole & His Trio - The Forgotten 1949 Carnegie Hall Concert, Hep 2010 CD
 1954: Afro Cuban Jazz North-of-the-Border
 1954: Afro-Cubano
 1958: Latin Fever, Liberty LRP-3093
 1950s: Mr. Bongo Has Brass, (Zephyr) 12003
 1950s: Mr. Bongo Plays Hi-Fi Cha Cha, (Tops) 1564
 1950s: Naked City & Other Themes, Liberty LST-7195
 2001: Back from Havana
 2002: Scorching the Skins
 2003: Latin Percussion with Soul
 2005: Versatile Mr. Bongo Plays Jazz, Afro and Latin

Selected singles
 A: "Mambo Costanzo" B: "Mr. Bongo" 1954
 A: "Barracuda" B: "I Got A Bongo" 1959
 A: "Viva Tirado" B: "Guantanamera"

With Stan Kenton
 Stan Kenton's Milestones (Capitol, 1943–47 [1950])
 Stan Kenton Classics (Capitol, 1944–47 [1952])
 Encores (Capitol, 1947)
 A Presentation of Progressive Jazz (Capitol, 1947)
 The Kenton Era (Capitol, 1940–54, [1955])
 Kenton with Voices (Capitol, 1957)
With Art Pepper and Conte Candoli
Mucho Calor (Andex, 1957) 
With Pete Rugolo
Rugolomania (Columbia, 1955)
New Sounds by Pete Rugolo (Harmony, 1954–55, [1957])
Percussion at Work (EmArcy, 1957)

Filmography
The Delicate Delinquent
Man From the Diners Club
Stool Pigeon Number 1
The Satin Bug
The Ed Sullivan Show (TV), three times as himself
The Art Linkletter Show (TV), as himself
The Edward R. Murrow Show (TV), as himself
1950: King Cole and His Trio with Benny Carter and His Orchestra, a Universal-International featurette, musician
1956: G.E. True Theater (TV series) - Judy Garland Musical Special, Musician
1956: Riddles in Rhythm (short), as himself
1957: The Nat King Cole Show (TV series), musician on song "Caravan"
1957: Bernardine, as himself
1957: The Dinah Shore Chevy Show (TV Series) - Episode No. 2.10, as himself
1959: The Danny Thomas Show (TV Series) - Terry Goes Bohemian
1959: Johnny Staccato (TV Series) - Nature of the Night, Musician
1960: Visit to a Small Planet, Percussionist
1965: Harum Scarum, Julna
2006: American Masters (TV series documentary) - The World of Nat King Cole, as himself

References

External links
[ Jack Costanzo] at Allmusic.com
http://www.spaceagepop.com/costanzo.htm
http://www.imdb.com/name/nm0182447/
Jack Costanzo Interview NAMM Oral History Library (2004)
Jack Costanzo Interview by Alex Pertout Alex Pertout MPhil ANU (2007)

1919 births
2018 deaths
American expatriates in Cuba
Musicians from Chicago
American jazz drummers
American jazz percussionists
Bongo players
Latin jazz drummers
Verve Records artists
Ubiquity Records artists
Conga players
20th-century American drummers
American male drummers
Jazz musicians from Illinois
20th-century American male musicians
American male jazz musicians
King Cole Trio members